Black Jesus is an American comedy series created by Aaron McGruder and Mike Clattenburg that aired on Adult Swim. The series stars Gerald "Slink" Johnson, Charlie Murphy, Corey Holcomb, Kali Hawk, King Bach, and Andra Fuller. The series premiered on August 7, 2014. On December 10, 2014, the series was renewed for a second season. The second season premiered on September 18, 2015. The series was renewed for a third and final season in 2017 confirmed by the creator and Slink Johnson, which premiered on September 21, 2019.

Series overview

Episodes

Season 1 (2014)

Season 2 (2015)

Season 3 (2019)

References

Black Jesus